In mathematics, Moreau's theorem is a result in convex analysis named after French mathematician Jean-Jacques Moreau. It shows that sufficiently well-behaved convex functionals on Hilbert spaces are differentiable and the derivative is well-approximated by the so-called Yosida approximation, which is defined in terms of the resolvent operator.

Statement of the theorem
Let H be a Hilbert space and let φ : H → R ∪ {+∞} be a proper, convex and lower semi-continuous extended real-valued functional on H. Let A stand for ∂φ, the subderivative of φ; for α > 0 let Jα denote the resolvent:

and let Aα denote the Yosida approximation to A:

For each α > 0 and x ∈ H, let

Then

and φα is convex and Fréchet differentiable with derivative dφα = Aα. Also, for each x ∈ H (pointwise), φα(x) converges upwards to φ(x) as α → 0.

References
   (Proposition IV.1.8)

Convex analysis
Theorems in functional analysis